Richard  Burke, 2nd Earl of Clanricarde (died 24 July 1582) was an Irish noble who succeeded his father Ulick na gCeann Burke, 1st Earl of Clanricarde as chief of a Gaelicised Norman family with authority over much of what is now County Galway. Richard's nickname was  "Englishman", because he took the English part during the Tudor reconquest of Ireland.

Richard's mother, Grace O'Carroll, was one of several putative wives of Ulick , such that there were rival candidates to succeed to the Earldom. Richard, the oldest legitimate son in English law, was the eventual successor. He was sporadically opposed by his brothers and half-brothers, including John, whose mother was of Maire Lynch, and who claimed the title in 1568. 

Richard extended his influence at the expense of the Ó Ceallaigh and the O'Maddens in the east of County Galway, gaining overlordship over the O'Shaughnessy in the south, while allying himself with the O'Conor Don and the O'Briens of Thomond. Other minor allies included the MacCostelloe and MacMorris, who acknowledged him to avoid encroachment from the Bourkes of Mayo. In 1559 Clanricarde fought on the losing side at the Battle of Spancel Hill during an O'Brien succession dispute.

Mac an Iarla War

From around 1570 his sons ( "son of the earl") rebelled against him and the Anglo-Irish government. That decade witnessed regular warfare across the county which devastated towns such as Galway, Athenry and Loughrea. Major engagements included:
1572 – First Sack of Athenry 
1573 – Beal an Chip 
1577 – Second Sack of Athenry 
1577 – Siege of Loughrea 
1579 – Lisdalon 
1580 – Sack of Loughrea 
1580 – Cill Tuathail

At the time of his death Burke had endured imprisonment in Dublin, and repeated treachery by his sons. After his death, further warfare was avoided when Ulick killed his brother John and was acknowledged as the 3rd Earl of Clanricarde.

Family
Richard married three times and had several children (possibly five sons and three daughters):
Firstly, he married Margaret O'Brien, daughter of Murrough O'Brien, 1st Earl of Thomond and Eleanor FitzGerald, before 6 October 1548. They were divorced after he claimed that she worked witchcraft against him. Their children were:
 Ulick Burke, later 3rd Earl of Clanricarde (died 1602)
 Mary Burke (c.1560 – c.1627)
Secondly, he married Margaret O'Brien, daughter of Donough O'Brien, 2nd Earl of Thomond and Helen Butler, on 24 November 1553. Their children were:
 John of the Shamrocks (murdered 1583)
 Unknown son
 Unknown son
 Unknown daughter
 Mary de Burgh
Thirdly, he married Julia MacCarthy, daughter of Cormac 'Oge' MacCarthy, in 1568. Their son was:
 William mac an Iarla Burke (executed 1580)

Richard had liaisons with several other women including Honora O'Brien, daughter of Turlogh O'Brien, with whom he had children:
 Margaret de Burgh who married (1) Richard Burke; and (2) Theobald Bourke, 1st Lord Bourke, Baron of Brittas (d.1654)
 Richard 'Og' Bourke
He also had liaisons with Sawny 'Oge' Burke and Julia Brown.

Annalistic references

 ARÉ1558.5. Maidhm mór la h-iarla Cloinne Riocaird ar Albanchoibh, & ro bé an t-iarla-sin Riocard mac Uillicc na c-Cenn, mic Riocaird, mic Uillecc Cnuic Tuagh, mic an Uillicc Medhonaicch mic Uillicc an Fhíona, & rob iad na h-Albanaigh for a t-tuccadh an maidhm-sin Domhnall mac Dubhghaill mic Giolla Espuicc Mic Ailin, & Dubghall mac Donnchadha mic Giolla Espuicc Mic Ailín, dá ócc-chonsapal urramhanta báttar acc reic a n-amhsaine athaidh fhada lé h-Ultoibh, & lé Cenél Conaill sech cách. Do iomraidhettar etorra fein lé borrfadh beódhachta & lé h-iomarcraidh árrachtais na h-oirir-sin d'fagbháil, & dol d'oirdhercucchadh a n-anmand ar fud chóiccidh Connacht, & as edh ro ghabhsat cetus co Crich Cairpre mic Neill tre Iochtar Ua n-Oilella, do crích Ghaileng (bhail in ro cobhsaigh Corbmac Gaileng mac Taidhcc, mic Cein, mic Oilealla Oluim iar lot enigh a athar) & do Thír Amhalgaidh mic Fiachrach. Tánaicc Mac Uilliam ina c-coinne annsin .i. Risdeard an Iarainn mac Dauid, mic Emainn, mic Uillicc, & ro gheall a c-cotucchadh ar dháigh chreach lomtha a chomharsan & folmaighthe a easccaratt. O 'd-chualaidh iarla Cloinne Riocaird an coimhthionol coiccriche sin do theacht lé a thaobh do thionoil an lion as lia ro fhéd d'armáil éideadh, & ordanais, & ní ro airis gusan maighin a m-bádar na h-Albanaigh ag Muaidh, & rob feirde dó a n-ionnsaicchidh uair do bhris for an f-fedhain allmardha, & for na foirnibh fraoch-duilghe sin, & ní ro cuimhnighsiot a fad ó n-athardha, & ó m-braithribh bunaidh uair ro fhulaingsiot dá n-esccairdibh a n-airleach ar én-lathair. Do marbhadh annsin Domhnall & Dubhgall, & bá ferr buaidh a n-anacail oldás buaidh a n-gona uair do-gébhthaoi a c-comhthrom dá gach ernail ionnmasa estibh, & dob éttreinitte Albanaigh co cend athaidh dá n-aimsir h-i c-coicceadh Chonnacht an ionnsaicchidh-sin.

 M1558.5. The Earl of Clanrickard gave a great defeat to the Scots. This Earl was Rickard, son of Ulick-na-gCeann, son of Rickard, son of Ulick of Cnoc-tuagh, son of Ulick Meodhanach, son of Ulick of the Wine; and the Scots who sustained that defeat were Donnell, the son of Dowell, son of Gillespick Mac Allen Campbell, and Dowell, the son of Donough, son of Gillespick Mac Allen, two brave young constables of gallowglasses, who had been a long time before hired into the service of the Ultonians, but more particularly in the service of Tirconnell. They had agreed among themselves, stimulated by extraordinary vigour and bravery, to leave those districts, and to proceed through Connaught, to render their names famous. They first passed through the territory of Carbry, the son of Niall, through the lower part of Tirerrill, by the territory of Gaileang (where Cormac Gaileang, the son of Teige, son of Kian, son of Oilioll Olum, settled after having violated the guarantee of his father), and into the country of Awley of Fiachra Tirawley. In this last mentioned territory Mac William (Richard-an-iarrainn, the son of David, son of Edmond, son of Ulick) came to meet them; and he promised to support them for plundering his neighbours and harassing his enemies. When the Earl of Clanrickard heard that this foreign host had arrived in his neighbourhood, he collected the greatest number that he was able of mail-clad warriors and ordnance, and did not halt till he arrived at the place where those Scots were, by the Moy. He was the better of attacking them there, for he routed this foreign band of fiercely rapacious warriors, who did not consider their distance from their native country and their kindred, for they suffered their enemies to slaughter them on the spot. Donnell and Dowell were slain there; but the victory would have been greater if they had been taken prisoners, instead of being slain, for an equivalent ransom in any kind of riches would have been received for them. The power of the Scots was enfeebled in Connaught for a considerable time after this attack.
 M1568.1. The Countess of Clanrickard, i.e. Margaret, daughter of Donough, son of Conor, son of Turlough, the most famous woman in Ireland, and the supporter of her friends and relations, died.

Arms

Citations

Sources

 Portumna Castle and its Lords, Michael Mac Mahon, 1983.
 Burke:People and Places, Eamon Bourke, Dublin, 1995.
 From Warlords to Landlords:Political and Social Change in Galway 1540–1640, Bernadette Cunningham, in "Galway:History and Society", 1996.
 Burke (de Burgh), Richard, Terry Clavin, in Dictionary of Irish Biography ... to the Year 2002, pp. 48–53, Cambridge, 2010

Politicians from County Galway
1582 deaths
Richard
Year of birth missing
16th-century Irish people
People of Elizabethan Ireland
Members of the Irish House of Lords
Earls of Clanricarde